Adrian Gheorghe Anca (born 27 March 1976) is a former Romanian football striker and manager.

Career 
Anca began playing football professionally for IS Campia Turzii in the Romanian second league. He later made his debut in the Romanian first league with Gloria Bistriţa. During the summer of 2003, Anca was traded to CFR Cluj, where he quickly became the team's top goalscorer, as well as the fan-favorite. In the summer of 2005, Anca helped CFR Cluj reach the 2005 Intertoto Cup final by scoring 5 goals in 10 matches in the campaign. In the summer of 2008, he joined the Romanian club Oţelul Galaţi but after only two months he cancelled his contract and signed with Gloria Bistriţa to be closer to his wife who was about the give birth.

In February 2010 he signed with Luceafărul Oradea, a Liga III club. He was an assistant coach besides him playing for the club. In June 2010 he was appointed head coach of Silvania Şimleu Silvaniei, but in October of the same year his contract was terminated. In 2011, Anca was for 11 months coach of Bihorul Beiuş in Liga III.

Honours
CFR Cluj
Liga I: 2007–08
Cupa României: 2007–08
Divizia B: 2003–04
UEFA Intertoto Cup runner-up: 2005

References

External links

1976 births
Living people
People from Diosig
Romanian footballers
Association football forwards
Liga I players
Liga II players
CSM Câmpia Turzii players
ACF Gloria Bistrița players
CFR Cluj players
ASC Oțelul Galați players
CS Luceafărul Oradea players
Romanian football managers
CS Luceafărul Oradea managers